Sarcoplasmic/endoplasmic reticulum calcium ATPase 3 is an enzyme that in humans is encoded by the ATP2A3 gene.

This gene encodes one of the SERCA Ca2+-ATPases, which are intracellular pumps located in the sarcoplasmic or endoplasmic reticula of cells. SERCA3 expression was originally described as non-muscular, but was recently observed in cardiomyocyte. This enzyme catalyzes the hydrolysis of ATP coupled with the translocation of calcium from the cytosol to the sarcoplasmic reticulum lumen, and is involved in calcium sequestration associated with muscular excitation and contraction. Alternative splicing results in 6 transcript variants encoding different isoforms named SERCA3a to SERCA3f.

Cancer 
ATP2A3 gene has been observed progressively downregulated in Human papillomavirus-positive neoplastic keratinocytes derived from uterine cervical preneoplastic lesions at different levels of malignancy. For this reason, ATP2A3 is likely to be associated with tumorigenesis and may be a potential prognostic marker for uterine cervical preneoplastic lesions progression.

References

External links

Further reading